Neodioctria is a genus of flies belonging to the family Asilidae.

The species of this genus are found in Australia.

Species:

Neodioctria australis

References

Asilidae